McLindon is a surname. Notable people with the surname include:

Aidan McLindon (born 1980), Australian politician
Dan McLindon (born 1940), Scottish footballer and manager

See also
McLendon
24386 McLindon, main-belt minor planet